Svenne Poulsen (born 11 November 1980) is a Danish professional football midfielder who currently plays for Danish team Hobro IK.

Poulsen was first noticed when he played for Randers FC in the Danish 1st Division, and he prolonged his Randers FC contract in May 2003. He helped Randers FC win promotion for the top-flight Danish Superliga, and scored three goals in 23 games for Randers FC in the 2004-05 Superliga season. In the summer 2005, Poulsen moved to league rivals FC Midtjylland, for whom he scored one goal in 14 games in the 2005-06 Superliga season. In the summer 2006, Poulsen moved to Danish 1st Division team AGF Aarhus. In the summer 2007, Poulsen's contract with AGF Aarhus was mutually terminated, and he went on to play for Danish 2nd Division club Hobro IK.

References

1980 births
Living people
Aarhus Gymnastikforening players
Randers FC players
FC Midtjylland players
Danish men's footballers

Association football midfielders